Galeotto Franciotti della Rovere (1471 – 11 September 1507) was an Italian Roman Catholic bishop and cardinal.

Biography
della Rovere was born in Lucca in 1471, the son of Francesco Franciotti and Luchina della Rovere, a member of the House of della Rovere.  He was a grandnephew of Pope Sixtus IV and a nephew of Pope Julius II.  His half-brother, Sisto Gara della Rovere, also became a cardinal.

He was elected Bishop of Lucca in October or November 1503 and occupied that office until his death.  He was consecrated as a bishop by his uncle Pope Julius II.  

Pope Julius II made him a cardinal priest in the consistory of 29 November 1503.  He received the red hat and the titular church of San Pietro in Vincoli on 6 December 1503.  

On 30 August 1504 he became the apostolic administrator of the see of Benevento, and filled this office until his death.  He became administrator of the see of Cremona from 27 May 1505, holding that post until shortly before his death.  He was Vice-Chancellor of the Holy Roman Church from 31 May 1505 until his death.  In May 1506, he was papal legate to Bologna.  In August 1507, he became administrator of the see of Vicenza.  He was a patron of the arts and a good friend of Cardinal Giovanni de' Medici, who later became Pope Leo X.

One historian notes:

della Rovere died of fever in Rome on 11 September 1507.  He is buried in Santi Apostoli, Rome.

References

1471 births
1507 deaths
16th-century Italian cardinals
Della Rovere family
16th-century Italian Roman Catholic bishops